The Colonial Film Unit (C.F.U) was a propaganda and educational film production organization of the British government.  It produced films for various British colonies including British Guiana and Nigeria. The Jamaica Film Unit was a division for films produced in Jamaica. The Colonial Film Unit was established in 1939 and produced 200 films before being shut down in 1955. It was part of Britain's Ministry of Information. It produced a magazine titled Colonial Cinema. Training filmmakers was also an important part of the unit's activities.

Originally established to produce British war propaganda, the C.F.U. transitioned to making instructional films after World War II.

Filmography
Learie Constantine, welfare worker and cricketer, a documentary about Learie Constantine's welfare department work
Springime in an English Village (1944)
African Visitors to the Tower of London (1949)
Journey by a London Bus (1950)
Towards True Democracy (1951)

See also
GPO Film Unit
Crown Film Unit

References

Further reading 
 
 

1939 establishments in the United Kingdom
1955 establishments in the United Kingdom